Sydenham Hill railway station is on the Chatham Main Line in England, serving Sydenham Hill, the Kingswood Estate, and Upper Sydenham, in south London. The station and all trains that call are operated by Southeastern, as part of the Bromley South Metro service. Sydenham Hill is in Travelcard Zone 3.

The station is at the north-western portal of the Sydenham Hill Tunnel, located in a deep cutting with access to all platforms (and the station itself) via steps. Originally the station was known as Sydenham Hill (for Crystal Palace), due to its proximity to the Crystal Palace, until 1936 when the palace was destroyed by fire.

Services 

All services at Sydenham Hill are operated by Southeastern using  and  EMUs.

The typical off-peak service in trains per hour is:
 2 tph to 
 2 tph to  via 

During the peak hours, additional services between London Victoria and Bromley South call at the station increasing the service to 4 tph in each direction.

References

External links 

Railway stations in the London Borough of Southwark
Former London, Chatham and Dover Railway stations
Railway stations in Great Britain opened in 1863
Railway stations served by Southeastern